Coup d'État: A Practical Handbook, first published in 1968, is a history book by Edward Luttwak examining the conditions, strategy, planning, and execution of coups d'état. A revised edition of the book, with references to twenty-first century technology, was published in 2016.

Critical response
In a 1980 review of the book, Richard Clutterbuck called Coup d'État: A Practical Handbook (1968) one of "only two general contemporary books on the subject" of military coups d'état that are worthwhile in content and readerly interest, the other being Samuel Finer's The Man on Horseback.  However, Clutterbuck criticises the book for not further emphasising the role of the news media in determining the likely success of a coup d'état.

References to the book
The book was reportedly studied by General Mohamed Oufkir, the ringleader of a failed plot to overthrow the Moroccan government, in 1972.

In 2006, Philippine President Gloria Macapagal Arroyo said the people's mass demonstration to force her to step down was what expert Edward Luttwak said in his Coup d'État: A Practical Handbook.

In 2013, during a period of turmoil in Egypt, Financial Times journalist Joseph Cotterill posted a chart on how to execute a coup, taken from Luttwak's book. The chart shows the three groups that the revolutionaries need in place, and the targets they need to seize, such as the residences of important personalities, TV stations, and then key traffic locations.

The 1978 thriller Power Play was based on the book. In the film, an idealistic military officer becomes sickened by the government's use of extrajudicial killing and torture to suppress the terrorism that their incompetence and corruption has fostered. He decides that for the good of the country he must attempt to overthrow the regime and end the chaos. Worried only about infiltration by agents of the hated internal security chief, who knows he can expect no mercy, the colonel leads the plot to success, but realises too late that he overlooked the danger of a clique within his coup's own forces, and finds himself facing a firing squad along with those he has deposed.

References 

1968 non-fiction books
Non-fiction books adapted into films
Books about coups d'état
Political science books
Harvard University Press books